Yongmun Station are railroad stations in South Korea.

 Yongmun Station (Yangpyeong)
 Yongmun Station (Daejeon)